Alliance Fiber Optic Products Inc. was set up in 1995 and now is based in Sunnyvale, California. The company engages in fiber optic components and integrated modules for communications equipment.

It was acquired by Corning Inc. in 2016.

References

External links 
 

Companies established in 1995
Companies listed on the Nasdaq
Corning Inc.